Sprouted bread is a type of bread made from whole grains that have been allowed to sprout, that is, to germinate, before being milled into flour. There are a few different types of sprouted grain bread.

Overview

Sprouted breads contain the whole, sprouted grain (the kernel, or berry) of various seeds. They are different from white bread inasmuch as white breads are made from ground wheat endosperm (after removal of the bran and germ). Whole grain breads include the bran, germ, and endosperm, therefore providing more naturally occurring fiber, vitamins and proteins. Sprouted (or germinated) grain breads have roughly the same amount of vitamins per gram.  Sprouted grain bread has 47% less gluten than regular bread.

A comparison of nutritional analyses shows that sprouted grains contain about 75% of the carbohydrates, slightly higher protein and about 40% of the fat when compared to whole grains.

In addition to wheat, sprouted breads may contain grains and legumes such as millet, barley, oat, lentil and soy. Bread that is made from an array of grains and legumes can provide a complete set of amino acids, the building blocks of proteins. Sprouted breads may contain slightly more trace minerals and nutrients than non-sprouted breads. Other than that, they supply much the same advantages as whole grain breads over refined grain breads, such as lowered risk of coronary heart disease.

Essene bread 

Essene bread is a simple form of sprouted grain bread made from sprouted wheat and prepared at a low temperature. Proponents of raw foods often eat it uncooked or slightly heated. The Essenes, a Jewish religious group that flourished from the 2nd century BC to the 1st century AD, are credited with the technique and basic recipes for Essene bread, although no scholarly evidence exists for this claim. Sprouting and low-temperature preparation ensure the maximum possible vitamin content for this foodstuff. Sprouting also breaks down the lectins and other substances that some individuals may be sensitive or allergic to.

See also

 Health food
 List of breads
 Malt
 Malt loaf
 Multigrain bread
 Wheatberry, a whole-wheat kernel before sprouting

References 

Breads
Whole wheat breads
Raw foods
Vegan cuisine